50th Birthday Celebration Volume 8 is a live album of improvised music by Susie Ibarra, Wadada Leo Smith and John Zorn documenting their performance at Tonic in September 2003 as part of Zorn's month-long 50th Birthday Celebration concert series.

Reception
The Allmusic review by Thom Jurek awarded the album 4 stars stating "This is one volume in this series not to miss."

Track listing

Personnel
John Zorn – alto saxophone 
Susie Ibarra – drums (Tracks 1-7 & 9)
Wadada Leo Smith – trumpet (Tracks 6-9)

References

Albums produced by John Zorn
John Zorn live albums
2004 live albums
Tzadik Records live albums